is a 2009 Japanese film adaptation of the eponymous manga by .

Plot 
An ordinary salaryman gets mixed up in the death of a legendary hitman, and has to lead a double life as the hitman's successor.

Cast 
 Shinji Takeda as Tokichi Inaba
 Mari Hoshino as Misako Inaba
 Yuri Morishita as Chinatsu
 Masaya Kikawada as Dual
 Kanji Tsuda as Round Glasses
 Kaoru Abe as Nekota
 Kaname Endō as Tanaka
 Motoki Fukami as Takao
 Hidekazu Ichinose as Suzuki
 Meguru Katō
 Daijiro Kawaoka as Mushroom Head
 Takayasu Komiya as Shuichi Endo
 Ken Maeda as Kamio
 Kōichirō Nomoto
 Jirō Satō
 Mitsuyoshi Shinoda as Nonezumi
 Hiroshi Yamamoto as Gaku Yamamoto
 Tomohisa Yuge as Yaginuma

References

External links 
 
 
  ("Kyō Kara Hitman" manga) (in Japanese)

2000s Japanese films
Toei Company films
Japanese drama films
Live-action films based on manga
2009 films
2000s Japanese-language films

ja:今日からヒットマン#.E6.98.A0.E7.94.BB